Polba Mahavidyalaya, established in 2005, is the general degree college in Polba, Hooghly district. It offers undergraduate courses in arts. It is affiliated to  University of Burdwan.

Departments

Arts
Bengali
English
History
Sanskrit
Philosophy
Political Science
Education
Geography
Economic (General)
Science

Geography (Hons.)

B.Sc (Gen)- Mathematics, Chemistry, Physics, Zoology, Botany.

Faculty
The college currently has twelve full-time teachers, along with a number of guest faculty members.
Dr. Sushanta Kumar Mazumdar (Principal);
Shri Narugopal Kaibarta (Assistant Professor of History);
Dr. Kali Prasad Mishra (Assistant Professor of Sanskrit);
Shri Sanjay Kr Ghosh (Assistant Professor of Bengali);
Smt Sharmishta Gupta (Dutta) [Assistant Professor of Philosophy];
Shri Sribas Biswas (Assistant Professor of Bengali);
Shri Santanu Sengupta (Assistant Professor of History);
Smt Pratima Dhali (Assistant Professor of Philosophy);
Shri Preetam Mandal (Assistant Professor of Sanskrit);
Shri Milan Kisku (Assistant Professor of Pol. Science);
Md. Mizanur Rahman Sardar (Assistant Professor of English);
Smt Manali Choudhury (Assistant Professor of English),Smt Amrita Das Mistri(Assistant Professor of Mathematics).

Accreditation
The college is recognized by the University Grants Commission (UGC). The college received its first accreditation in 2016. UGC-NAAC awarded B grade to the Mahavidyalaya.

See also

References

External links
Polba Mahavidyalaya

Universities and colleges in Hooghly district
Colleges affiliated to University of Burdwan
Educational institutions established in 2005
2005 establishments in West Bengal